The Australasian Performing Right Association Awards of 1982 (generally known as APRA Awards) are a series of awards held in 1982. The inaugural APRA Music Awards were presented by Australasian Performing Right Association (APRA) and the Australasian Mechanical Copyright Owners Society (AMCOS). There were no awards presented in 1983: while the next ceremony occurred in 1984.

Awards 

Only winners are noted

See also 

 Music of Australia

References

External links 

 APRA official website

1982 in Australian music
1982 music awards
APRA Awards